The Ningbo–Jinhua railway is a double-track railway currently under construction in China. The project will see  of new railway built from Yunlong railway station near Ningbo to Yiwu railway station. The railway is one of the first purpose built electrified railways capable of operating double stack container trains in China.

History
Construction began on 29 December 2016.

Stations
The line has the following stations:
Fenghua railway station (passenger and freight)
Xikou railway station (passenger)
Shengzhou Xinchang railway station (passenger)
Nanshanhu railway station (freight)
Hulu railway station (reserved)
Dongyang railway station (passenger and freight)
Yiwu railway station

References

Railway lines in China